The lyre-tailed honeyguide (Melichneutes robustus) is a species of bird in the family Indicatoridae. It is monotypic within the genus Melichneutes. It is found in the African tropical rainforest :

Angola, Cameroon, Central African Republic, Republic of the Congo, Democratic Republic of the Congo, Equatorial Guinea, Gabon, Nigeria, Uganda and west of the Dahomey Gap in Guinea, Sierra Leone, Liberia, Ivory Coast and Ghana.

References

External links
 Image at ADW

lyre-tailed honeyguide
Birds of the African tropical rainforest
lyre-tailed honeyguide
lyre-tailed honeyguide
Taxonomy articles created by Polbot